Korak napred 2 koraka nazad (A Step Forward 2 Steps Backwards) is a various artists cover album, featuring nine Serbian bands performing cover versions of the popular Yugoslav rock songs, released in 1999. The album was intended to be released for the 10th anniversary of the Radio B92, however, before the album release, the station was taken over by the government. Nevertheless, the compilation was released.

Track listing

Additional personnel 
 Škart — album cover [design]
 Velja Mijanović — producer, engineer [post-producer], mastered by

References 
 Korak napred 2 koraka nazad at Discogs
 EX YU ROCK enciklopedija 1960-2006, Janjatović Petar; 

 

1999 compilation albums
Covers albums
Hardcore punk albums by Serbian artists
Alternative rock albums by Serbian artists
Indie rock albums by Serbian artists
Reggae albums by Serbian artists
Funk albums by Serbian artists
Pop rock albums by Serbian artists
Electronic albums by Serbian artists
Compilation albums by Serbian artists
Pop rock compilation albums
Alternative rock compilation albums
Reggae compilation albums
Indie rock compilation albums
Funk compilation albums
Electronic compilation albums